Borokhula was one of Genghis Khan's generals. 

He was found after the destruction of the Jurhen, one of the tribes of Mongolia, by Jebe, and given to Hoelun. 

He saved Genghis Khan's son Ögedei during the battle of Khalakhaljid Sands by sucking clotted blood out of Ogedai's neck from an arrow wound.  After his rescue of Ögedei, he informed Genghis of where the enemy had fled to, and was later sent to lead an invasion of the Khori-tumats. However, he was cut off by enemy scouts and killed.

Generals of the Mongol Empire
Year of birth unknown
Year of death unknown